Aphaenops laurenti is a species of beetle in the subfamily Trechinae. It was described by Genest in 1983.

References

laurenti
Beetles described in 1983